Metarctia nigricornis is a moth of the subfamily Arctiinae. It was described by Hubert Robert Debauche in 1942. It is found in the Democratic Republic of the Congo.

References

 

Metarctia
Moths described in 1942